The 1993 Gael Linn Cup, the most important representative competition for elite level participants in the women's team field sport of camogie, was won by Leinster, who defeated Ulster in the final, played at Conneff Park Clane. For the first year of a two-year experimental period, the Gael Linn Cups were played with teams of 15-a-side, as a prelude to the increase in team size from 12 to 15 in 1999 for all matches.

Arrangements
Leinster defeated Munster 5–7 to 2–10 at Clane. Ulster received a walkover from Connacht. Leinster defeated Ulster 6–14 to 1–4 in the final.
Irene Kirwan and Annette Heffernan scored Leinster's goals to defeat Munster in the Gael Linn trophy semi-final. Connacht gave Ulster a walkover. Ulster defeated Leinster 4–5 to 1–9 in the final at Clane.

Final stages

Junior Final

References

External links
 Camogie Association

1993 in camogie
1993
Cam